Michel Poon-Angeron (born 19 April 2001) is a Trinidadian football player who currently plays for Banfield.

Career statistics

International

References

2001 births
Living people
Trinidad and Tobago footballers
Trinidad and Tobago international footballers
Trinidad and Tobago expatriate footballers
Association football midfielders
Club Atlético Banfield footballers
Expatriate footballers in Argentina